Genidens is a genus of sea catfishes found along the Atlantic coast of South America. There are currently four recognized species in this genus.

Species
 Genidens barbus (Lacépède, 1803) (white sea-catfish)
 Genidens genidens (G. Cuvier, 1829) (Guri sea-catfish)
 Genidens machadoi (A. Miranda-Ribeiro, 1918)
 Genidens planifrons (H. Higuchi, E. G. Reis & F. G. Araújo, 1982)

References

Ariidae
Catfish genera
 
 
Taxa named by François-Louis Laporte, comte de Castelnau